Full of Grace is a 2022 Spanish film directed by Roberto Bueso. The cast features Carmen Machi, Paula Usero and Pablo Chiapella, among others.

Plot 
Set in 1994, with the backdrop of the 1994 FIFA World Cup, the plot tracks a nun who arrives to an orphanage about to close down (El Parral) and helps to create a football team among the kids.

Cast

Production 
The screenplay was penned by Roberto Bueso and Óscar Díaz Cruz. It was shot in the Valencia Region, including Carcaixent, Burjassot, San Antonio de Benagéber, Quesa, Paterna, L'Eliana and Gandia.

Release 
Full of Grace was selected to screen out of competition as the closing film of the 25th Málaga Film Festival on 27 March 2022. Distributed by Paramount, the film was theatrically released in Spain on 24 June 2022.

It also screened at the 52nd Giffoni Film Festival in July 2022. ViX+ picked up rights for a streaming release in August 2022.

Reception 
Jonathan Holland of ScreenDaily considered the story to be "the very definition of good, old-fashioned fun", also featuring the central performance delivered by Machi which is "a joy to behold", underscoring that "despite some plot absurdities, the script is careful to keep things emotionally true".

Carlos Marañón of Cinemanía scored 3½ out of 5 stars, considering that the film ("as kind as it is funny") is supported by a "portentous" casting of youngsters making their debut in front of the camera.

Beatriz Martínez of El Periódico de Catalunya scored 3 out of 5 stars, considering that the film (featuring a good director and cast behind as well as a nostalgic element) manages to have "the right doses of spirit of improvement, good intentions and a little hope in human beings, which given the circumstances, we need".

Accolades 

|-
| rowspan = "9" align = "center" | 2022 || 52nd Giffoni Film Festival || colspan = "2" | Best Feature Film (elements +10) ||  || 
|-
| rowspan = "8" | 5th Berlanga Awards || colspan = "2" | Best Film ||  || rowspan = "8" | 
|-
| Best Director || Roberto Bueso || 
|-
| Best Screenplay || Roberto Bueso || 
|-
| Best Cinematography and Lighting || Víctor Entrecanales || 
|-
| Best Original Score || Vicente Ortiz Gimeno || 
|-
| Best Supporting Actress || Paula Usero || 
|-
| Best Production Supervision || Lorena Lluch || 
|-
| Best Costume Design || Giovanna Ribes || 
|}

See also 
 List of Spanish films of 2022

References 

Paramount Pictures films
2022 comedy-drama films
Spanish comedy-drama films
Films about Catholic nuns
Films set in 1994
Spanish association football films
Films set in orphanages
Films shot in the province of Valencia
2020s Spanish-language films
2020s Spanish films